Robert Monsey Rolfe, 1st Baron Cranworth, PC (18 December 1790 – 26 July 1868) was a British lawyer and Liberal politician. He twice served as Lord High Chancellor of Great Britain.

Background and education
Born at Cranworth, Norfolk, he was the elder son of the Reverend Edmund Rolfe and Jemima Alexander, James Alexander, 1st Earl of Caledon's niece and a granddaughter of physician Messenger Monsey. Rolfe, a relative of Admiral Lord Horatio Nelson, was educated at Bury St Edmunds, Winchester, Trinity College, Cambridge, Downing College, Cambridge (of which he was elected fellow)  and was called to the bar, Lincoln's Inn, in 1816.

Legal and political career
Cranworth represented Penryn and Falmouth in Parliament from 1832 until he was appointed a Baron of the Exchequer in 1839. In 1850 he was appointed a Vice-Chancellor and raised to the peerage as Baron Cranworth, of Cranworth in the County of Norfolk. In 1852 Lord Cranworth became Lord Chancellor in Lord Aberdeen's coalition ministry. He continued to hold the chancellorship also in the administration of Lord Palmerston until the latter's resignation in 1858. Cranworth was not reappointed when Palmerston returned to office in 1859, but on the retirement of Lord Westbury in 1865 he accepted the office for a second time, and held it till the fall of the Russell administration in 1866.

Personal life
In 1845, Cranworth married Laura Carr (1807–1868), daughter of Thomas William Carr (born 1770). The couple had no children.

Lord Cranworth died at his seat, Holwood House, on 26 July 1868, aged 77, after a short illness related to the heat. He was childless and the title became extinct on his death.

Cases
Fouldes v. Willoughby (1841)
Aberdeen Rly Co v Blaikie Bros (1854)
Scott v Avery (1855)
Jones v Lock (1865)
Rylands v. Fletcher judgment given 9 days before his death.

Arms

References

Notes

External links 

Lord chancellors of Great Britain
Rolfe, Robert Monsey
Barons in the Peerage of the United Kingdom
Rolfe, Robert Monsey
Rolfe, Robert Monsey
Rolfe, Robert Monsey
UK MPs who were granted peerages
1790 births
1868 deaths
Barons of the Exchequer
Solicitors General for England and Wales
People from Breckland District
Members of the Privy Council of the United Kingdom
Members of the Judicial Committee of the Privy Council
Peers of the United Kingdom created by Queen Victoria